The XIII International AIDS Conference was held in Durban, South Africa, during the week of July 9-14 2000.  12,000 people from all over the world attended, including scientists, clinicians, health care workers, public health agencies, people living with HIV/AIDS, AIDS Non-Governmental Organizations, politicians, and the media.  This conference has taken place regularly since its inception in 1985, and now takes place every two years.

Theme 
Each conference has a theme.  The theme for 2000 was "Breaking the Silence", which is described as "the urgent need to break the silence on equal access to treatment and care; improved and ongoing prevention of HIV transmission; governmental and private sector support of HIV education and resources; human rights; access of appropriate and meaningful information to all sectors and ensuring a supportive environment for people living with HIV/AIDS (PWA) in society."

Issues 
There seems to have been a battle between the political and scientific communities happening on the fringes of the conference.

It was at this conference that Professor Jeffrey D. Sachs, then Chairman of the WHO Commission on Macroeconomics and Health, first called for a global fund to fight AIDS.  This recommendation was picked up the following year in the establishment of the Global Fund to Fight AIDS, TB, and Malaria.  This can be supported from a presentation which Professor Sachs presented during the conference (slide 10).

Closing Ceremony 
An 83-year-old and fragile-looking Nelson Mandela gave the closing address, and part of it is reproduced here:
To have been asked to deliver the closing address at this conference, which in a very literal sense concerns itself with matters of life and death, weighs heavily upon me for the gravity of the responsibility placed on one.

No disrespect is intended towards the many other occasions where one has been privileged to speak, if I say that this is the one event where every word uttered, every gesture made, had to be measured against the effect it can and will have on the lives of millions of concrete, real human beings all over this continent and planet. This is not an academic conference. This is, as I understand it, a gathering of human beings concerned about turning around one of the greatest threats humankind has faced, and certainly the greatest after the end of the great wars of the previous century.
...
We need, and there is increasing evidence of, African resolve to fight this war. Others will not save us if we do not primarily commit ourselves. Let us, however, not underestimate the resources required to conduct this battle. Partnership with the international community is vital. A constant theme in all our messages has been that in this inter-dependent and globalised world, we have indeed again become the keepers of our brother and sister. That cannot be more graphically the case than in the common fight against HIV/AIDS.

References 

International AIDS Conferences
International conferences in South Africa
2000 in South Africa
2000 conferences
History of Durban
July 2000 events in Africa
July 2000 events in South Africa
Events in Durban